The 1997 Maine Black Bears football team represented the University of Maine in the 1997 NCAA Division I-AA football season. They played their home games at Alumni Stadium as a member of the Atlantic 10 Conference. They were led by fifth-year head coach Jack Cosgrove. The Black Bears finished the season 5–6, 4–4 in conference play, to finish tied for second in the New England Division.

Previous season

The Black Bears finished the 1996 season with a record of 7–4, with a 5–3 mark in the Yankee Conference to finish in second place in the New England Division.

Schedule

References

Maine
Maine Black Bears football seasons
Maine Black Bears football